Super Fly T.N.T. is a 1973 American blaxploitation crime drama film directed and starring Ron O'Neal. O'Neal reprises his role of Youngblood Priest from the 1972 film Super Fly. The film was both a critical and commercial failure according to some critics.

The film was released on VHS in 1993, but it has not been released on DVD or Blu-ray. It was shot in Rome, Italy and other locations such as Senegal. A sequel, The Return of Superfly, was released in 1990, with Nathan Purdee as Priest.

Plot
Youngblood Priest and Georgia have now relocated to Rome from New York City and now are living in Rome. Priest drops Georgia off and when she goes to the place, she meets a black American man named Jordan who recognizes her from New York City. Priest meanwhile has been feeling bored in Rome, so he plays poker games with Italian businessmen every day to entertain himself. In one of the games, Priest has a run-in with Dr. Lamine Sonko, whose country of Umbria was destroyed by battle tanks and who came here to talk to Priest, however he ignores him.

Priest then has a dinner engagement with Georgia, Jordan and his girlfriend, Lisa and after they talk, Jordan starts singing, much to the dismay of Priest.

Georgia tells Priest that she wants children and to start a family, but Priest refuses. He then meets Jordan the next morning and they talk about their previous lives in New York City, with Priest mentioning a little bit about him being a drug dealer. After he has a horse riding lesson, Priest meets dr. Sonko, however they’re attacked by an assassin, but dr. Sonko manages to subdue him in time.

Priest and the doctor go to Priest’s place, where they talk about Umbria, Priest refuses to help dr. Sonko however and he leaves. Priest then realizes that dr. Sonko was right about Umbria and tells Georgia that he’s going there, which makes her angry. The next morning, Priest arrives in Umbria, and then back in Rome, decides to help dr. Sonko. In one of his casino games, he talks to one of the businessmen, Matty Smith, to help him with the weapons.

Matty agrees and the next morning, Priest says goodbye to Georgia and dr. Sonko before he boards the plane. After landing however, he is betrayed by the people and detained by soldiers in the airport, who bring them to their commander and beat him up before keeping him in a jail cell.

The commander then calls Dr. Sonko and priest hears from nearby how the poor doctor has to accept defeat from the soldiers. The commander then leaves and one of his henchmen goes to check on Priest, but is electrocuted by him, the other also goes to check, but he is also beaten to death by Priest.

Priest then goes out of the place and into some Africans standing in a circle with him in the middle of it. Priest then returns from Umbria, all nice and safe and reunites happily ever after with Georgia again.

Cast
 Ron O'Neal as "Youngblood" Priest
 Roscoe Lee Browne Dr. Lamine Sonko
 Sheila Frazier as Georgia
 Robert Guillaume as Jordan Gaines
 Jacques Sernas as Matty Smith
 William Berger as Lefebre
 Silvio Noto as George, Restaurant Proprietor
 Olga Bisera as Lisa
 Federico Boido as Rik, Mercenary
 Dominic Barto as Rand
 Minister Dem as General 
 Jeannie McNeil as Riding Instructress
 Luigi Orso as Crew Chief
 Curtis Mayfield as himself; his band, The Curtis Mayfield Experience, also appears in the  film.

Soundtrack

The soundtrack was done by English/African/Caribbean band Osibisa and charted at #159 on the Billboard charts and #41 on R&B albums.  It has been re-issued on CD by Red Steel Music with bonus tracks in 1995.

Track listing
All songs arranged, performed and composed by Osibisa.

Musicians
Teddy Osei, from Ghana; - tenor sax, flute, African drums & vocals
Sol Amarfio, from Ghana; - drums
Mac Tontoh, from Ghana; - trumpet, flugel horn, kabasa
Jean Mandengue, from the French Cameroons; – bass guitar, percussion, vocals
Gordon Hunte, from Guyana; - lead guitar & vocals
Robert Bailey, from Trinidad; - organ, piano, timbales
Kofi Ayivor, from Ghana; - congas, African drums, percussion, vocals

Additional brass arrangements by Mike Gibbs

Release
The film was to be released by Warner Bros. but they dropped the film a month before it was due to be released due to concerns about unfavourable reaction from certain groups, similar to that received by the original.

The film premiered in New York City on June 15, 1973, which was boycotted by members of the Congress of Racial Equality.

In popular culture
In the 1994 film Pulp Fiction, Jules Winnfield, portrayed by Samuel L. Jackson (who acts in The Return of Superfly), says to John Travolta's Vincent Vega, "Every time my fingers touch brain, I'm Super Fly T.N.T. I'm the Guns of the Navarone."

References

External links 

 

1973 films
1973 crime drama films
American crime drama films
American gangster films
American sequel films
Blaxploitation films
Films set in Africa
Films shot in Rome
Films shot in Senegal
Paramount Pictures films
Works by Alex Haley
African-American films
1970s English-language films
1970s American films